The 1987 CONCACAF U-16 Championship was a North American international association football tournament, it determined the 1987 FIFA U-16 World Championship entrants from the CONCACAF region. The 1987 edition of the competition was held in Honduras.

First round

Group A

Group B

Final Group

Mexico and USA qualified to the 1987 FIFA U-16 World Championship in Canada.

References 

1987
U-17
1987
1986–87 in Costa Rican football
1986–87 in Mexican football
1986–87 in Honduran football
1987 in American soccer
1986–87 in Salvadoran football
1987 in youth association football